Emerson Nicolás Correa (born 30 August 1994) is an Argentine professional footballer who plays as a goalkeeper.

Career
Correa's career began in the youth systems of River Plate and All Boys. After departing All Boys, Correa joined Argentino de Merlo. 2016 saw Defensores Unidos sign Correa. He made nine appearances across two seasons in Primera C Metropolitana from 2016–17, with the club winning promotion to Primera B Metropolitana in 2017–18. His first appearance in the third tier arrived in November 2018 during a 2–1 victory over Atlanta. In July 2020, Correa departed back to tier four with Sportivo Italiano.

Career statistics
.

Honours
Defensores Unidos
Primera C Metropolitana: 2017–18

References

External links

1994 births
Living people
Place of birth missing (living people)
Argentine footballers
Association football goalkeepers
Primera C Metropolitana players
Primera B Metropolitana players
Argentino de Merlo footballers
Defensores Unidos footballers
Sportivo Italiano footballers
Real Pilar Fútbol Club players